Arvei Angulo Rivas (born April 13, 1982 in Valencia, Venezuela), known as El Prieto (also known as Prieto Gang, and originally known as Colombia), is a singer, songwriter and producer of Venezuelan hip hop.

Career 
Rivas was born in Valencia, Venezuela on April 13, 1982. Raised in the violent, crime-ridden slums of Petare, Rivas' experiences of living there has served as inspiration for his music.

El Prieto began his career as a rapper shortly after returning from Colombia to Venezuela. After meeting Rekeson in a nightclub and doing a freestyle with him, they decided to form a rap duo, and that's where Guerrilla Seca (GCK) was born. In those times; approximately in the year 1995, rap was very underground, sounding only "La Corte." Rekeson and Prieto Beretta (then known as Colombia), were dedicated to improvise in the streets, where they caught the attention of Juan Carlos Echendia, who hired them for Subterráneo Records, where they made their first record with other underground rap groups, called Venezuela Subterránea.

After three years, they decided to release another record, and from the hand of Subterráneo Records the second (First solo) disc of Guerrilla Seca was born, which they called "La Realidad Más Real" (The Most Real Reality), it was quite famous, making them known practically in all of Venezuela, and urging rap to be popularized.

In 2006, three years after the success of The Most Real Reality, El Prieto and Rekeson had some personal problems and decided to release two albums alone, but at the same time and under the name of GCK so as not to damage the duo. This is how "Yo contra el mundo" (Me Against the World) and "Jugando Vivo" (Playing Live) were bon. Me Against The World was criticized a lot by the fans of the duo, the opposite of Rekeson's work, which was positively received. But their differences would not last long because two years later they would already be working on their new album.

Also known for his strong differences between his exmanager Juan Carlos Echendia of the record company Subterráneo Records and the deceased singer, Mc Ardilla. Were the most talked among other conflicts in the genre, breaking through other singers.

In 2008, they decided to release "Al Aire Pero Preso" (Free But Jailed), this time as a duo again, without the help of Subterráneo Records, with whom they had some differences. The album was very accepted by the fans, but its success did not last long because one year later El Prieto and Rekeson had differences again, which caused them to separate definitively and culminate with the Guerrilla Seca project, leaving many fans disappointed. However, Rekeson continued to work on his side, as El Prieto did.

More than 8 million visits has the video "Petare barrio de pakistan" (Petare Neighborhood Of Pakistan), part I, on YouTube.

"People do not see the positive side of the video, but the negative side, it's not apology, the positive side: we want to give a message to Venezuela and Latin America of what is happening right now in the neighborhood, which is not just Petare Barrio of Pakistan, but it is all of Latin America of Pakistan, because all the neighborhoods of Latin America are equal", comments El Prieto.

"In every neighborhood there are good and bad things, everyone plays basketball and football, but suddenly those people who played sports, are victims of a bad play and end up troubled. That's where the mess starts, what on the street we call Pakistan."

"Everyone knows that Pakistan is not in Venezuela, that remains in another continent, but people associate that there is a war and that many people die. The people that die there by attack, fall here every weekend. Do not cover the sun with a finger."

References

Sources

External links
El Prieto on Facebook.
El Prieto on Twitter.
El Prieto on YouTube: PrietoGangVevo, Prieto Gang.
El Prieto on Instagram.

1982 births
Hip hop singers
Rap rock musicians
Living people
21st-century Venezuelan male singers